Fall River is a river in southeast Kansas that flows through Greenwood, Elk, and Wilson Counties. The source of the river is in west Greenwood County approximately 4.5 miles northwest of Eureka. It is a tributary of the Verdigris River and its confluence with the Verdigris is approximately 2 miles south of Neodesha. It is also known as the South Verdigris River.

Fall River was dammed in southeastern Greenwood county forming Fall River Lake. Fall River State Park is located on this lake.

See also
List of rivers of Kansas

References

Rivers of Kansas
Rivers of Greenwood County, Kansas
Rivers of Elk County, Kansas
Rivers of Wilson County, Kansas